Rememory is a 2017 British-American-Canadian science fiction mystery film directed by Mark Palansky and written by Mark Palansky and Michael Vukadinovich. The film stars Peter Dinklage, Julia Ormond, Anton Yelchin, Henry Ian Cusick, Gracyn Shinyei and Colin Lawrence. The film premiered at the 2017 Sundance Film Festival on January 25, 2017. The film was released on Google Play on August 24, 2017, before being released in theaters and video on demand on September 8, 2017, by Lionsgate Premiere. The film received generally negative reviews from critics.

Plot
Sam Bloom (Peter Dinklage) and his brother Dash (Matt Ellis) are driving in the night when their car collides with another, causing his brother’s death.

After a year, scientific pioneer Gordon Dunn (Martin Donovan) mysteriously dies. He has created a device that allows one to record memories and watch them. Bloom sets about trying to solve the murder using this memory machine. Bloom learns that Dunn’s device has a technical fault which causes recurring hallucinations for its users including him. Most of the users have been quite upset with Dunn, directly blaming him for their mental deterioration. He also finds out that Dunn and his wife Carolyn (Julia Ormond) were separated after they lost their only daughter in an accident. After a confrontation with one of his patients, Dunn realized how much pain his machine caused people and attempted to use it to erase his own painful memories. However, doing so resulted in his death when the machine sent him into synaptic failure.

Bloom re-watches his “accident memory” and finds out that the Dunns were in the other car and that their daughter was killed in the collision. Bloom had fled the scene after seeing the little girl dead, leaving his brother to take the fall. Bloom hands over his memory to Carolyn as a sort of confession apology. Time passes and it is unclear if she watches the memory glass, later she throws it into the sea with Dunn’s recordings as she watches her daughter playing on the water—a hallucination resulting from her own use of the memory device. A montage of the lives of everyone affected by the device is shown over the launch of the repaired memory device while a recording by Dunn plays describing the power of memories for a person.

Cast

Production
On March 27, 2012, Catherine O'Hara and Peter Dinklage joined the cast of the film. On February 10, 2016, Julia Ormond replaced O'Hara in the film. Principal photography began in Gastown, Vancouver on January 25, 2016, and ended on February 22, 2016.

Release
The film premiered at the 2017 Sundance Film Festival on January 25, 2017. The film was released on Google Play on August 24, 2017, before being released in theaters and video on demand on September 8, 2017, by Lionsgate Premiere.

Reception
 Review aggregator website Rotten Tomatoes gives the film an approval rating of 25%, based on 20 reviews with a consensus reading, "Rememory has some intriguing themes and a compelling cast to work with, but they're lost in the fog of a forgettable melodrama."

Guy Lodge of Variety reviewed the film, saying, "A bit of a trudge, despite Dinklage's committed and empathetic performance." Yasmin Kleinbart of The Young Folks and Scott Beggs of Nerdist both went on to say that "Dinklage deserves better than this film." Meredith Borders of Birth.Movies.Death. shared similar sentiments, saying, "If it weren't for Dinklage's remarkable performance, the film would have very little to recommend it."

John DeFore of The Hollywood Reporter gave a more positive review, saying, "A good-looking mystery whose sci-fi elements take a back seat to meditations on guilt and deception."

See also 
 Reversion, a 2015 film also dealing with a human memory device

References

External links
 

2017 films
2017 drama films
2010s mystery drama films
2010s science fiction drama films
American mystery drama films
American science fiction drama films
British mystery drama films
British science fiction drama films
Canadian mystery drama films
Canadian science fiction drama films
English-language Canadian films
Films about memory
Films shot in Vancouver
Lionsgate films
2010s English-language films
2010s American films
2010s Canadian films
2010s British films